Big Blue is a nickname for IBM, an American multinational technology and consulting corporation.

Big Blue or big blue may also refer to:

Arts and entertainment
 "Big Blue" (song), a 2019 song by Vampire Weekend from the album Father of the Bride
 Big Blue (TV series), a Canadian animated television series
 The Big Blue, a 1988 film by director Luc Besson
 A legendary lake monster in The X-Files episode "Quagmire"
 A fictional planet in F-Zero and Mario Kart 8
 A fictional blue whale in Ecco the Dolphin
 A nickname for Superman, short for "Big Blue Boy Scout"

Sports
 IBM Big Blue (rugby union), a Japanese rugby union team founded by IBM
 The Big Blue (A-League Men), a football rivalry between A-League sides Sydney FC and Melbourne Victory
 Big Blue (mascot), the mascot of Old Dominion University, Virginia, US
 New York Giants, an American football team based in New Jersey, US
 Bob Pettit (born 1932), former NBA player 
 Millikin University, Illinois, US
 The mascot of Utah State University, US
 The mascot of the Pingry School, New Jersey, US
 The sports teams at Phillips Academy, Massachusetts, US
 A large type of American handball

Other uses
 Big Blue (crane), a crane that collapsed during the construction of Miller Park
 Big Blue (drink), a soft drink
 Conrail, the primary Class I railroad in the Northeast U.S. between 1976 and 1999
 The Big Blue Hotel, a hotel at Blackpool Pleasure Beach, UK
 A nickname for the Church of Scientology's Pacific Area Command Base

See also
 Big Blue River (disambiguation), several rivers